Arnold (or Arnoud) II of Horne (1339–1389) was the son of Willem IV of Horne and Elisabeth of Cleves. He was canon, provost, Bishop of Utrecht from 1371 to 1378, and Bishop of Liège from 1378 to 1389.

After the death of bishop Jan van Virneburg in 1371, the cathedral chapter nominated its provost Zweder Uterlo as candidate for the bishopric, but the rest of the chapters supported the papal candidate Arnold van Horne, who as a result become bishop. Arnold seems to have been a forceful bishop, though he endangered the financial state of the bishopric. He involved himself in the Guelders War of Succession in 1371–1372, which almost led to his capture, and from 1373 to 1375 he waged war against the County of Holland over the advantageously located trading town of Vreeswijk. These actions had little results however, while they cost a lot of money. While the western border of the Sticht was re-enforced and the Hollandic advance was halted, Holland still held the mouth of the rivers Vecht and Lek, which kept Utrecht isolated.

Bishop Arnold was forced to grant participation to the Utrecht burghers in the administration of the land, in the Landbrief (landletter) of 1375, after which they accepted new taxes in order to straighten out the financial status of the bishopric. This Landbrief is an important document that is considered the first constitution of the Nedersticht.

Now that the wars had been halted, an old party struggle in the city erupted again, with the Gunterlingen on one side and the Lichtenbergers on the other side. Bishop Arnold managed to keep the parties separate, but he was moved to the Bishopric of Liège in 1378 by Pope Urban VI. However, the chapter at Liege had chosen someone else for the bishopric, and this candidate was supported by Antipope Clement VII. Only after a year of struggle was Arnold able to take his seat at Liege.

Arnold of Horne was a learned man who was a good organiser, and able to inspire people. He was also adept at the Vielle.

1339 births
1389 deaths
14th-century Roman Catholic bishops in the Holy Roman Empire
Prince-Bishops of Utrecht
Prince-Bishops of Liège
People from Leudal